Troy Caupain Jr. (born November 29, 1995) is an American professional basketball player for Pallacanestro Brescia of Lega Basket Serie A. He played college basketball for Cincinnati.

High school career
Caupain attended Cosby High School and started on the basketball team as a sophomore, averaging 7 points per game. Moving to point guard, he scored 25.7 points per game and was named All-Metro as a junior. As a senior, he scored 26 points and pulled down 15.1 rebounds per game. Caupain was named All-Metro player of the year.

College career
In Caupain's freshman season at Cincinnati, he served as a backup to star Sean Kilpatrick and participated in the team's asphyxiating defense. As a sophomore, Caupain averaged 9.4 points and 3.6 assists per game. He was named Honorable Mention All-AAC. As a junior, he was named to the First Team All-AAC. Caupain led the team in scoring and assists with 13.0 points and 4.8 assists per game while contributing to a 22–11 season.

Coming into his senior year, Cincinnati was picked to win the AAC regular season title and Caupain was voted as AAC Preseason Co-Player of the Year. He averaged 10.5 points, 4.6 rebounds and 4.4 assists in 2016–17, finishing sixth in Division 1 with a 3.36-to-1 assist to turnover ratio. Caupain was named first team NABC All-District 25 and Second Team All-AAC. He helped lead the Bearcats to a 30–6 record and the university’s seventh consecutive NCAA Tournament appearance. In his career, he had a school-record 515 assists and scored 1,317 points, tying Cashmere Wright for 22nd place on the school all-time scoring list.

Professional career
After going undrafted in the 2017 NBA draft, Caupain signed a summer league contract with the NBA's Toronto Raptors and received a subsequent training camp invite from the Orlando Magic on August 31, however, he was waived on October 13. Ten days later, he was acquired by the Lakeland Magic of the NBA G League, averaging 15.8 points, 7.5 rebounds, 5.7 assists and 1.4 steals in 51 games.

On April 4, 2018, after the conclusion of the G League season, Caupain signed with G.S.A. Udine of the Italian Serie A2 Basket. 

On July 11, 2018, Caupain signed a two-way contract with the Orlando Magic. Under the terms of the deal, Caupain split time with Orlando and their NBA G League affiliate, the Lakeland Magic. Caupain made his NBA debut on December 31, 2018 in a 125–100 loss to the Charlotte Hornets, scoring five points with two assists in five minutes of playing time.

On September 12, 2019, Caupain joined the Portland Trail Blazers for training camp. On October 18, 2019, the Trail Blazers waived Caupain.

On November 3, 2019, Caupain signed a one-year deal with Hapoel Holon of the Israeli Premier League.  On December 28, 2019, Caupain recorded 23 points, while shooting 8-of-12 from the field, along with six rebounds and four assists in an 84–91 loss to Hapoel Jerusalem. On February 6, 2020, he parted ways with Holon.

On February 21, 2020, Caupain signed with Filou Oostende of the Belgian Pro Basketball League.

On July 31, 2020, he has signed with ratiopharm Ulm of the German Basketball Bundesliga.

On June 30, 2021, he has signed with Darüşşafaka Tekfen of the Basketball Super League.

On July 7, 2022, he has signed with Pallacanestro Brescia of Lega Basket Serie A.

Career statistics

NBA

Regular season

|-
| align="left" | 
| align="left" | Orlando
| 4 || 0 || 4.0 || .500 || .667 || – || .8 || 1.0 || .3 || .0 || 2.5
|-class="sortbottom"
| align="center" colspan="2"| Career
| 4 || 0 || 4.0 || .500 || .667 || – || .8 || 1.0 || .3 || .0 || 2.5

College

|-
| style="text-align:left;"| 2013–14
| style="text-align:left;"| Cincinnati
| 34 || 0 || 19.1 || .380 || .328 || .784 || 2.3 || 2.2 || .9 || .1 || 5.4
|-
| style="text-align:left;"| 2014–15
| style="text-align:left;"| Cincinnati
| 34 || 33 || 31.3 || .444 || .408 || .788 || 3.6 || 3.6 || 1.2 || .2 || 9.6
|-
| style="text-align:left;"| 2015–16
| style="text-align:left;"| Cincinnati
| 33 || 33 || 33.5 || .375 || .324 || .788 || 3.8 || 4.8 || 1.1 || .4 || 13.0
|-
| style="text-align:left;"| 2016–17
| style="text-align:left;"| Cincinnati
| 36 || 36 || 32.3 || .394 || .325 || .687 || 4.6 || 4.4 || 1.2 || .3 || 10.5
|- class="sortbottom"
| style="text-align:center;" colspan="2"| Career
| 137 || 102 || 29.1 || .397 || .338 || .762 || 3.6 || 3.8 || 1.1 || .2 || 9.6

References

External links
 Cincinnati Bearcats bio
 RealGM profile

1995 births
Living people
American expatriate basketball people in Israel
American expatriate basketball people in Italy
American expatriate basketball people in Belgium
American men's basketball players
Basketball players from Virginia
Cincinnati Bearcats men's basketball players
Darüşşafaka Basketbol players
Hapoel Holon players
Lakeland Magic players
Orlando Magic players
Pallalcesto Amatori Udine players
People from Midlothian, Virginia
Point guards
ratiopharm Ulm players
Undrafted National Basketball Association players